The Borgward BFK-1 Kolibri, a.k.a. Borgward-Focke BFK-1 Kolibri, (Kolibri meaning "hummingbird" in German) was a German three-seated utility helicopter built by Borgward, designed by Heinrich Focke and was the first German helicopter after World War II. The helicopter first flew on July 8, 1958, in Bremen, piloted by Ewald Rohlfs.

Design and development
Two prototypes were built; they had steel tubing fuselages, covered with metal and fabric and v-tails with tail rotors at their tips. The plywood covered main rotors had three blades with steel tubing spars. The helicopter had a six-cylinder air-cooled Lycoming VO-435-A1B engine, producing 260 hp. The fuel tank was capable of holding 180L. The helicopter could be used for spraying in agriculture, and could carry up to 300 lbs. Development ended after the two prototypes, as Borgward went bankrupt shortly after in 1961.

Specifications

Notes

References

1950s German civil utility aircraft
1950s German helicopters
Borgward
Single-engined piston helicopters
Aircraft first flown in 1958